In Shinto,  is the collective name for the first gods which came into existence at the time of the creation of the universe. They were born in Takamagahara, the world of Heaven at the time of the creation. Unlike the later gods, these deities were born without any procreation.

The three deities that first appeared were:
 - Central Master
 - High Creator
 - Divine Creator 
A bit later, two more deities came into existence: 
 - Energy
 - Heaven
The next generation of gods that followed was the Kamiyonanayo, which included Izanagi-no-Mikoto and Izanami-no-Mikoto, the patriarch and matriarch of all other Japanese gods, respectively. Afterward, the Kotoamatsukami "hides away" as hitorigami.

Though the Zōkasanshin (three deity of creation) are thought to be genderless, another theory stated Kamimusuhi was the woman and Takamimusubi the man, comparing them with water and fire or with yin and yang.

The theologian Hirata Atsutane identified Amenominakanushi as the spirit of the North Star, master of the seven stars of the Big Dipper.

Strangely, Takamimusubi later reappeared together with Amaterasu as one of the central gods in Takamagahara, and his daughter was the mother of the god Ninigi-no-Mikoto. He also played important roles in the events of the founding of Japan, such as selecting the gods who would tag along with Ninigi and sending the Yatagarasu, the three legged solar crow, to help Emperor Jimmu, who in turn, greatly worshiped him by playing the role of medium priest taking Takami Musubi's identity, in the ceremonies before his Imperial Enthronement. Later, Takamimusubi was worshiped by the Jingi-kan and considered the god of matchmaking. Some Japanese clans also claimed descent from this god, such as the Saeki clan, he is also an Imperial ancestor.

As for Kamimusuhi, he (or she) has strong ties with both the Amatsukami (heavenly gods) and the Kunitsukami (earthly gods) of Izumo mythology. Kamimusuhi is also said to have transformed the grains produced by the food goddess Ōgetsuhime (Ukemochi no kami) after she was slain by Amaterasu's angered brother.

See also
Japanese creation myth
 Creation myth
Japanese mythology

Notes

Creation myths
Japanese deities
Shinto kami
Amatsukami